Safety Harbor is a city on the west shore of Tampa Bay in Pinellas County, Florida, United States. It was settled in 1823 and incorporated in 1917. The population was 16,884 at the 2010 census.

History
The area has been inhabited since the Stone Age. In June 2008, a 6,000-year-old spearhead was found at Marshall Street Park.  The inhabitants of the area at the time of Spanish exploration were the Tocobaga people, who lived in villages around Tampa Bay. The adaptation of this culture relied on wild resources.  Safety Harbor sites have yielded pottery, and artifacts of copper, shell, and stone.  The Tocobaga were known for constructing various ceremonial and communal mounds to bury the dead.  Most of these mounds were destroyed in the early 1900s due to development.  However, one of these ceremonial mounds is still visible in Safety Harbor's Phillippe Park (see photo).  Shells found in these mounds were used to pave city streets.

In 1528 Spanish explorer Pánfilo de Narváez landed in the area, followed by Hernando de Soto in 1539. Safety Harbor (formerly known as Worth's Harbor and Green's Springs) was first homesteaded by Count Odet Philippe, a French nobleman who is credited with introducing the grapefruit to Florida in 1823. The name Safety Harbor originated from the early 18th century, when pirates were a substantial influence in the area. Once ships reached this area of the bay, all threats from pirates were gone, and it was commonly referred to as a "Safe Harbor".

Springs
Safety Harbor is the home of the historic Espiritu Santo Springs, or "Springs of the Holy Spirit", a natural mineral spring. Its waters were given this name in 1539 by the Spanish explorer Hernando de Soto, who was supposedly searching for the mythical "Fountain of Youth". Prior to the Spanish exploration of Florida, the Tocobaga and Timuquan tribes are believed to have fished and bathed in the spring's waters.

In the twentieth century, Espiritu Santo water was bottled and sold commercially, and later a health spa and hotel were built over the springs. The Safety Harbor Resort and Spa, as it is now known, continues to be a prominent visitor attraction in Pinellas County. In 1964, the site was designated a Historical Landmark by the U.S. Department of the Interior and, in 1997, a Florida Heritage Landmark.

Geography
The city is located on the west side of Safety Harbor, a waterway connected to Tampa Bay.

Demographics

As of the census of 2010, there were 16,884 people, 7,084 households, and 4,845 families residing in the city. The racial makeup of the city was 92.23% White, 4.14% African American, 0.24% Native American, 1.68% Asian, 0.05% Pacific Islander, 0.44% from other races, and 1.21% from two or more races. Hispanic or Latino of any race were 3.65% of the population.

There were 7,084 households, out of which 28.8% had children under the age of 18 living with them, 56.3% were married couples living together, 9.1% had a female householder with no husband present, and 31.6% were non-families. 25.2% of all households were made up of individuals, and 8.5% had someone living alone who was 65 years of age or older.  The average household size was 2.37 and the average family size was 2.85.

The age distribution of the population is: 21.8% under the age of 18, 4.9% from 18 to 24, 28.6% from 25 to 44, 27.4% from 45 to 64, and 17.3% age 65 or older.  The median age was 42 years. For every 100 females, there were 91.0 males.  For every 100 females age 18 and over, there were 87.1 males.

The median income for a household in the city was $51,378, and the median income for a family was $59,911. Males had a median income of $41,883 versus $31,165 for females. The per capita income for the city was $28,632.  About 3.6% of families and 5.6% of the population were below the poverty line, including 5.1% of those under age 18 and 8.3% of those age 65 or over.

Arts and culture
Safety Harbor Public Library is part of the Pinellas Public Library Cooperative. Founded in 1938, the original location was at the Community House.

Government 
Safety Harbor is governed by an elected Mayor and City Commission. City governmental departments are administered by a City Manager, who is appointed by the City Commission.

Education

There are two public schools within the city: Safety Harbor Elementary School for grades one to five, and Safety Harbor Middle School for grades 6 to 8.

Infrastructure
The CSX railroad branch line from Tampa to St. Petersburg bisects Safety Harbor. Passenger trains last used the line in 1984.

Notable people

 Matt Geiger, professional basketball player
 Alan Lomax, collector of folk music, folklorist, and writer
 Dave Martinez, professional baseball player and manager
 Taffy Nivert, singer and songwriter with Starland Vocal Band
 Robin Zander, musician with Cheap Trick

References

External links

City of Safety Harbor official website

Cities in Pinellas County, Florida
Populated places on Tampa Bay
Cities in Florida